"It's Too Late" is a song from American singer-songwriter Carole King's second studio album, Tapestry (1971). Toni Stern wrote the lyrics and King wrote the music. It was released as a single in April 1971 and reached number 1 on the Billboard Hot 100 and Adult Contemporary charts. Sales were later gold-certified by the RIAA. Billboard ranked "It's Too Late" and its fellow A-side, "I Feel the Earth Move", as the No. 3 record for 1971.

Music and lyrics 
The lyrics describe the blameless end of a loving relationship. Music critic Dave Marsh saw implicit feminism because the woman left the man. Marsh also remarked on the maturity of the theme.  Music critic Robert Christgau wrote that "if there's a truer song about breaking up than 'It's Too Late,' the world (or at least AM radio) isn't ready for it."  Marsh described the melody as Tin Pan Alley and the arrangement as a cross between light jazz and "L.A. studio craftsmanship." Rolling Stone remarked that King's "warm, earnest singing" on the song brought out the song's sadness. According to author James Perone, the feel of the song is enhanced by the instrumental work of Danny Kortchmar on guitar, Curtis Amy on saxophone and King on piano. Kortchmar and Amy each have an instrumental solo. Cash Box described the song as "a sensitive ballad with a strong rock under-beat."

Toni Stern told author Sheila Weller that she wrote the lyrics in a single day, after her relationship with James Taylor ended. The recording won a Grammy Award for Record of the Year in 1972, and the song is included in Rolling Stone's 500 Greatest Songs of All Time.

Personnel
Carole King – piano, vocals
Curtis Amy – soprano saxophone
Danny "Kootch" Kortchmar – conga, electric guitar
Charles "Charlie" Larkey – bass guitar
Joel O'Brien – drums
Ralph Schuckett – electric piano

Soundtracks 
"It's Too Late" has been featured in Hollywood films, including Fandango (1985), The Lake House (2006), and Invincible (2006).

Awards and recognition 
 King's version of "It's Too Late" peaked at No. 1 on the Billboard Hot 100 and Adult Contemporary charts. It was on the Hot 100 as a double A-side with "I Feel the Earth Move".
 King's version of "It's Too Late" was gold-certified by the RIAA.
 "It's Too Late" won a Grammy Award for Record of the Year in 1972.
 "It's Too Late" is ranked No. 469 on Rolling Stone's list of the 500 greatest songs of all time. It was dropped in the 2010 version but updated to No. 310 in the 2021 version.
 Together with its other A-side, it was named by the RIAA as No. 213 of 365 Songs of the Century.

Charts

Weekly charts 
Carole King

Bill Deal & the Rhondels

Year-end charts

All-time charts

Certifications

Gloria Estefan version 

 
In 1995, Cuban American singer and songwriter Gloria Estefan released her cover of "It's Too Late" as the third promotional single (in the US), and fourth overall single released from her fourth studio album, Hold Me, Thrill Me, Kiss Me (1994).

Critical reception
AllMusic editor Eddie Huffman described Estefan's version as "[a] moment of genuine pathos" in his review of the Hold Me, Thrill Me, Kiss Me album. Steve Baltin from Cash Box felt that the singer "does a decent job with the vocals, but this
is one of those songs that everybody feels they own. As such, it’s better off being left alone." Chuck Campbell from Knoxville News Sentinel viewed it as a "faithful" remake of Carole King's 1971 hit, "though Tim Mitchell's intrusive electric-guitar solo is an unwelcome addition." Phil Shanklin of ReviewsRevues remarked that King’s voice does possess the same warmth as Estefan's.

Official versions
 Album version – 3:57
 Piano mix – 3:38
 Radio mix – 3:19

Release history

Charts

Weekly charts

Year-end charts

Formats and track listings

Other notable versions 
The song has been covered by
 1972: The Isley Brothers on their album Brother, Brother, Brother; reaching  39 on the R&B chart
 1991: Dina Carroll with the duo Quartz, earning her first hit; it reached No. 8 in the UK Singles Chart
 2022: Lucy Dacus

References

External links 
 
 

1971 singles
1991 singles
1995 singles
Doo-wop songs
Songs written by Carole King
Carole King songs
Gloria Estefan songs
The Isley Brothers songs
Song recordings produced by Lou Adler
Billboard Hot 100 number-one singles
Cashbox number-one singles
RPM Top Singles number-one singles
Grammy Award for Record of the Year
Songs about heartache
Songs written by Toni Stern
Ode Records singles
1971 songs
Epic Records singles